Dactylopus kuiteri, known commonly as the Kuiter's dragonet, is a species of marine fish in the family Callionymidae.

The Kuiter's dragonet is widespread throughout the tropical waters of the central Indo-Pacific region and particularly around Indonesia.

This species reaches a length of  TL.

The specific name honours the collector and author of the Pictorial guide to Indonesian reef fishes, Rudie H. Kuiter.

References

External links
http://www.marinespecies.org/aphia.php?p=taxdetails&id=317624
 

kuiteri
Fish described in 1992